The Ikwerre (natively known as Iwhuruọha) is one of the Igbo subgroups in Rivers State. They are the biggest ethnic group in Rivers state.Traditional history has classified Ikwerre into seven groups called "Ikwerre Essa". They are Elele, Isiokpo,  Rumuji,  Emohua, Choba,  Aluu  Igwuruta and Obio group.  This division was recognized by Forde and Jones; (1950) in their ethnographic study of the Igbo speaking peoples of South Eastern Nigeria though has been disputed by indigenous ikwerre people. It was also in line with this grouping those seven customary Courts were established in Ikwerre during the Colonial administration. These Courts were located at Elele, Isiokpo, Umuji, Emohua, Choba, Aluu  and  Obio in Ikwerreland.

Geography and cultural grouping 
The Ikwerre inhabit the upland part of Rivers State. and are predominantly settled in the Ikwerre, Obio-Akpor, Port Harcourt and Emohua local government areas of Rivers State.

The Ikwerrre division  was recognized by  Forde and  Jones;  (1950) in their ethnographic study of the Igbo and  Ibibio speaking peoples and other tribes of southern Nigeria. It was  also  in  line with this  grouping that seven customary Courts were established  in Ikwerre during the  Colonial administration. These Courts were  located at Elele, Isiokpo, Rumuji,  Emohua, Akpor, Aluu  and  Obio  in Ikwerreland in the Igboid family.

The Ikwerre cultural area is bordered by Ogba to the northwest, the Ekpeye and Abua to the west, the Ijoid groups of Degema, the Kalabari and Okrika to the south, the Eleme and Oyigbo to the southeast
and the Etche to the east.

The Ikwerre are made up of four main groups, namely the Elele group (Ishimbam), the Igwuruta-Aluu (Ishiali) group, the Rumuji-Emohua-Ogbakiri (REO) or Risimini group, and the OPA group (Obio/Port Harcourt/Akpor).

The Ishimbam or Elele clan cluster is located at the northern part of Ikwerre land, in Ikwerre and Emohua Local Government Areas. Most of these communities believe in one ancestor called "Ochichi" whose descendants founded most of the clans.
Elele is believed to have been founded by "Ele", Ochichi's first son.
This is why Elele is called Okaniali among the Ishimbam clans.
The Ishimbam clans include:
Elele,
Akpabu,
Elele-Alimini,
Egbeda,
Omerelu,
Apani,
Ubimini and
Omudioga.
The Ishiali or Esila group inhabit the remaining parts of Ikwerre Local Government Area. Clans here include:
Isiokpo,
Ipo,
Igwuruta-Ali,
Aluu,
Omuanwa,
Omademe,
Omagwa,
Ozuoha and
Ubima.

The REO (Rumuji/Emohua/Ogbakiri) cluster, or (R)Ishimini (as classified by Ogbakor Ikwerre), inhabit the southern part of Emohua Local Government Area. They are located in a riverine area. This cluster comprises:
Odegu clan:
Rumuji
Rumuodogo
Ovogo
Evekwu
Rumuewhor
Ndele
Rumuekpe
Uvuahu clan:
Ibaa
Obelle
Emohua clan
Ogbakiri clan

The OPA (Obio-Port Harcourt-Akpor) is a broad cluster that occupies the entire Obio/Akpor and Port Harcourt Local Government Areas. 
It is subdivided into the Obio and the Akpor groups.

 Obio: The Obio group is divided into three: Evo, Apara and Rebisi (Port Harcourt). Obio is regarded as the common ancestor of the Evo and Apara communities; Evo is the senior while Apara is younger.
 Evo: This is subdivided into three:
 Oro–Evo: (Rumuodomanya, Rumurorlu, Oginigba, Rumuobiakani, Rumuobochi, Woji, Rumuibekwe, Rumuogba)
 Oro – Esara: (Okporo:{Rumukwurushi, Rumuodara, Iriebe}, Rumuokoro, Oroigwe, Atali)
 Oropotoma: (Rumuomasi and Elelenwo)
 Apara: Apara, the second son of Obio, had nine children: Eneka, Nkpoku, Ekinigbo, Okwuta, Adaolu (a female), Epirikom, Ola, Orosi, and Rebisi. These descendants founded the principal Apara communities of Eneka, Rukpokwu, Rumuigbo, Rumuokwuta, Rumuadaolu, Rumuepirikom, Rumuola, and Rumuorosi, respectively. Rumueme was established in the Apara territory, after Ozuruoha, one of Epirikom's descendants had invited his in-laws from Isiokpo to help him wage a war against his kinsman. Rumueme is said to be where these warriors from Isiokpo had resided permanently. Rumuomoi also joined in the said war and is believed to come from Isiokpo and joined Apara later.
 Rebisi: This is an offshoot of the Apara clan. Rebisi had fled Apara during a conflict with his brothers. Rebisi had seven children: Ochiri, Adasobia, Olozu, Worukwo, Ezimgbu, Ogbum and Abali. The descendants founded: Orochiri, Oroada, Orolozu, Oroworukwo, Oromerezimgbu, and Ogbumnuabali (a merger of Orogbum and Oroabali), respectively. Internal migrations led to the establishment of other communities from the original seven, such as Elekahia. Others are Nkpogu, Nkpolu Oroworukwo, Nkpolu Orogbum, Rumuwoji, Rumukalagbo, Oroije, Rumuibekwe and Orominieke.
 Akpor: Akpor is located east of the REO group, south of the Ishiali group and west of Obio. The clan has ten communities: Ozuoba, Choba (Isoba), Ogbogoro, Rumuosi, Rumuolumeni, Rumuokparali, Rumualaogu, Rumuokwachi, Rumuekini and Alakahia.

The Ikwerre exist in well-delineated clans, with each clan having its own paramount king. The Ikwerre do not have an overall paramount ruler or king, but designated kings, rulers or leaders mostly approved by their constituents. However, all paramount rulers in Ikwerre are united in what is known as Ogbakor Ikwerre, which was formed in 1963 as an umbrella socio-cultural organization of the Ikwerre people.

Ikwerre land and industrial activities 
The Ikwerre play host to several multinational oil-producing and servicing companies, in addition to many other industries and establishments. Despite these, the Ikwerre, like nearly all other minorities of the Niger Delta, frequently complain of marginalisation by the oil operatives.

"The Ikwerre community faced problems of marginalization, extreme poverty and environmental degradation of its land and rivers in the Niger Delta through the exploitation of oil and gas resources. Calls were made for the full participation of the Ikwerre people in the control of 
resources and decision-making on development; the urgent provision of electricity; improved 
health care and education services; and youth employment opportunities."

Establishments in Ikwerre land 

"The acquisition of Ikwerre land began in 1913 by the British colonial government when it acquired a parcel of land from the Rebisi clan of Diobu because the then colonial government wanted to develop a harbor in the area. Once the sea port was established, the place became busy with commerce and trade and with a beehive of activities.

In recent times, as the tempo of oil and gas exploration increased in Rivers State, it invariably put more pressure on Ikwerre land and its resources. As land was needed for development purposes within Port Harcourt and its environs, it was natural to turn to Ikwerre people who inhabit Port Harcourt and the surrounding territories.

Origin
The Ikwerre are a subgroup of the Igbo people of Nigeria. They are descendants from an Igbo migration from Awka and Orlu areas towards the south. They are part of the Southern Igbo. Before the civil war, there had been dissident voices that claimed that Ikwerre could have migrated from Owerri, Ohaji, Ngwa, and Etche areas of Igboland. But when Port Harcourt was conquered by Nigeria during the Biafran War and the Igbo people from other parts of Igboland fled the territory, a UN report says that the Ikwerre decided to claim that the Ikwerre were non-Igbo for convenience. The Ikwerre are recognized officially as a separate group in the 1979 Nigerian Constitution.

Theories of origin 
Some Ikwerre people migrated from Ika a subgroup of Igbos in Delta State and Edo state while some migrated from Ngwa, Arochukwu and Ohaji/Egbema.

The Aro first came into the Ikwerre area through Ozuzu-Etche, settling at Isiokpo, Igwuruta, Omagwa, etc. As expected of pre-literate African societies, the history of the people is wrapped in myth and mystery. This presupposes that historians may have to resort to oral tradition for the justifiable/credible reconstruction of the people's history. From the post-colonial dispensation to the present, professional historians and other personals have attempted to reconstruct the history of the people. For instance, the works of Elechi Amadi, especially The Concubine, The Great Ponds, The Slave (novels) and Isiburu (a verse play) are a literary attempt at reconstructing a semblance of the Ikwerre society in the pre-colonial era.

Notable people
 
 
 Simeon Chituru Achinewhu 
 Elechi Amadi, writer
 Rotimi Amaechi, former Governor of Rivers State
 Mercy Chinwo, gospel musician
 Tonto Dikeh, actress, musician
 Wisdom Budu Ihunwo, Anglican Bishop of Niger Delta North
 Omah Lay, musician 
 Duncan Mighty, musician
 Celestine Omehia|, former Governor of Rivers State
 Emmanuel Onunwor, former Mayor of East Cleveland, Ohio, USA
 Austin Opara, former Deputy Speaker of Nigeria's House of Representatives
 Herbert Wigwe, CEO, Access Bank PLC
 Ezenwo Nyesom Wike, current Governor of Rivers State
 Chukwuemeka Woke, current Chief of Staff to the Rivers State Government

See also
 Rebisi
 Indigenous peoples of Rivers State

Notes

 
Igbo subgroups
Indigenous peoples of Rivers State
Igbo people